European Parliament elections were held in France on Sunday 7 June 2009 to elect the 72 French Members of the European Parliament.

Due to the entry of Romania and Bulgaria in the European Union in 2007, the number of seats allocated to France was revised from 78 to 72 seats, a loss of 6 seats.  France now represents only 9.8% of all European MEPs compared to 12.5% in 2004 and 19.8% in 1979, following the first European election.

The turnout in European elections in France has almost always declined, with the sole exception of an increase in 1994, falling from 60.7% turnout in the 1979 election to 43.1% in the latest election in 2004.

Candidates for parliamentary parties

Opinion polls

Results
Nicolas Sarkozy's governing Union for a Popular Movement (UMP) won a pleasing result, the first time the presidential party had won since the first European elections in 1979.  Compared to the party's disastrous 2004 result, it gained 12 seats and over 11% in the popular vote.  However, many have said that the UMP is the only governing party in France, making its position very weak compared to the combined opposition.

Led since the tumultuous Reims Congress by Martine Aubry, the main opposition party, the Socialists, won a very bad result: only 16.48% and suffering a loss of 17 seats.  Prominent Socialist MEPs, including defeated leadership candidate Benoît Hamon, lost their seats.  The Socialists lost most votes in middle-class urban areas, while holding their ground better in their rural strongholds.

The Europe Ecology was the surprise of these elections, with a remarkable 16.28% and the same number of MEPs as the Socialist Party.  The green coalition's result was the best result ever for any French Green party, beating out the previous record set by Antoine Waechter in the 1989 European elections – 10.59%.  The gains made by the Greens also came from the centrist MoDem led by François Bayrou.  The MoDem won only 8.45%, a surprisingly low result for the centrist party, thought to be France's third party.

The far-right FN suffered loses, being reduced to only 3 MEPs. The conservative nationalist Libertas coalition formed around Philippe de Villiers's Movement for France, but also including the smaller agrarian Hunting, Fishing, Nature, Tradition, suffered losses compared to the two parties' combined 8% showing in 2004.  De Villiers was re-elected, becoming the only Libertas.eu MEP elected in the European Union.

On the left of the PS, the new Left Front formed around the French Communist Party and the smaller Left Party surpassed Olivier Besancenot's New Anticapitalist Party.  The Left Front and an ally overseas won 6.47% and 5 seats, while Besancenot's NPA won only 4.88% and no seats (despite polling better on aggregate than Libertas, which did win a seat).

References

External links
Bureau d’Information pour la France du Parlement européen: Élections européennes 7 Juin 2009

France
European Parliament elections in France
Europea
European Parliament election